Angissoq LORAN-C transmitter was a LORAN-C transmitter at Nanortalik-Angissoq, Greenland at GRI 7930, 59°59'18"N, 45°10'24" W. It had a transmission power of 1000 kilowatts.
Until July 27, 1964, it used a 1350 ft (411.48 metre) mast radiator, built in 1963. On July 27, 1964, it collapsed from the fatigue failure of an eyebolt head in a compression cone insulator on a structural guy. 
It was replaced by a 704 ft (214 metre) mast radiator.
On December 31, 1994, the transmitter was shut down and the tower dismantled.

See also
 List of masts

External links
 Excel-File with information about LORAN-C transmitters
 https://web.archive.org/web/20060527121359/http://www.greenlandcontractors.dk/da/articles/PituffikNews-2006-5/%24file/PN_nr_5_2006.pdf
 http://www.skyscraperpage.com/cities/?buildingID=57148
 http://www.skyscraperpage.com/cities/?buildingID=57149
 
 

Towers in Greenland
LORAN-C transmitters
1963 establishments in Greenland
Towers completed in 1963